Chase Aaron Strumpf (born March 8, 1998) is an American professional baseball second baseman and third baseman in the Chicago Cubs organization. He played college baseball at UCLA. Strumpf was selected by the Cubs in the second round of the 2019 Major League Baseball draft.

Early life
Strumpf was born in Atlanta, Georgia, and grew up in Dana Point, California.  His parents are Gregg and Nani Strumpf, and he has a sister named Chloe.

High school
Strumpf attended JSerra Catholic High School in San Juan Capistrano, California. During his freshman year, he committed to play college baseball at UCLA. After his freshman year, he played on the USA Baseball 15U National Team, helping Team USA win a gold medal in Barranquilla, Colombia.  He was a 2014 Perfect Game USA second team Underclass All-American, a 2015 Perfect Game USA first team Underclass All-American, and a 2016 Rawlings/Perfect Game Honorable Mention All-American. He was not drafted out of high school in the 2016 Major League Baseball draft, and enrolled at UCLA.

College
In 2017, Strumpf's freshman year at UCLA, playing second base he appeared in 55 games (making 54 starts), hitting .239/.315/.399 with seven home runs and 30 RBIs. That summer, he played for the Duluth Huskies in the wood bat Northwoods League, where after playing primarily shortstop and batting .335/.425/.549 (ninth in the league) over 164 at-bats with six home runs, he was named a post-season All-Star. As a sophomore at UCLA in 2018, Strumpf started 58 games in which he slashed .363/.475/.633 with 59 runs, 23 doubles, 12 home runs, 53 RBIs, and 45 walks, ranking second in doubles and third in on-base percentage while ranking in the top ten in the other statistics (except RBIs) within the conference. He was top-50 in the NCAA in doubles (13th), on-base percentage (25th), total bases (36th), and slugging percentage (49th).  He was named to the Pac-12 First Team, and was named D1Baseball, Collegiate Baseball, and Perfect Game All-American second team. After the season, he was selected to play for the USA Baseball Collegiate National Team, but was unable to participate due to injury. 

Prior to his 2019 junior season, Strumpf was named a preseason All-American by D1Baseball, Perfect Game, Baseball America, Collegiate Baseball, and the National Collegiate Baseball Writers Association. He finished his junior year batting .279/.416/.472	in 233 at bats with nine home runs, 44 RBIs, 48 walks (fifth in the conference), and eight hit by pitch (eighth) in 63 games.  He was again named to the Pac-12 First Team. In his three-season college career he batted an aggregate .297/.409/.507, while playing second base where he had a .983 fielding percentage.

Professional career
Strumpf was considered one of the top prospects for the 2019 Major League Baseball draft. He was selected by the Chicago Cubs in the second round with the 64th overall pick, and signed for a signing bonus of $1.05 million. 

Strumpf made his professional debut in 2019 with the Rookie-level Arizona League Cubs, and was promoted to the Eugene Emeralds of the Class A Short Season Northwest League after seven games. After 26 games with Eugene, he was promoted to the South Bend Cubs of the Class A Midwest League with whom he finished the year while playing through a back injury. Over 39 games between the three clubs, Strumpf slashed .244/.374/.400 in 135 at-bats with three home runs and 17 RBIs, while playing second base. He was named a 2019 Northwest League Mid-Season All Star. He did not play a minor league game in 2020 due to the cancellation of the minor league season caused by the COVID-19 pandemic, but in the instructional league he batted .375/.414/.792. 

To begin the 2021 season, Strumpf was assigned back to South Bend, now members of the High-A Central. On June 1, he was promoted to the Tennessee Smokies of the Double-A South. In late August, he was placed on the injured list and missed the remainder of the season. Over 78 games played between South Bend and Tennessee, Strumpf slashed .231/.352/.381 in 268 at-bats with 19 doubles, seven home runs, and 36 RBIs. He played 56 games at third base and 18 games at second base. 

Strumpf returned to Tennessee for the 2022 season. Over 116 games and 393 at bats, he slashed .234/.379/.461 with 73 runs (seventh in the league), 22 doubles, 21 home runs (seventh), 57 RBIs, 73 walks (fifth), and 19 hit by pitch (second). In the field he played second base (59 games), third base (55 games), and first base (3 games).

References

External links

 UCLA Bruins bio

1998 births
Living people
Baseball players from Atlanta
Baseball players from California
Baseball second basemen
People from Dana Point, California
UCLA Bruins baseball players
United States national baseball team players
Arizona League Cubs players
Eugene Emeralds players
South Bend Cubs players
Tennessee Smokies players
Duluth Huskies players